Alessandro Potenza (born 8 March 1984) is an Italian football coach and a former player who played as a defender.

Club career

Inter Milan
Potenza came from the youth system of Inter Milan, and was called up to the first team squad for the 2002–03 Serie A season. He only made one appearance for Inter's first team in a Coppa Italia match against A.S. Bari, 4 December 2002.

Loan Spells
In 2003, he was loaned out to Serie B side Ancona, to gain experience. After finding playing time limited at Ancona, he was loaned out to Serie A outfit Parma. With Parma, he found more success and plenty of first team action. In 2005 Inter loaned him out to another Serie A side. This time it was Chievo. After another decent campaign, Spanish side Mallorca wanted to bring Potenza out to La Liga. Again, Inter opted to loan him out. After yet another fairly impressive season, he caught the eye of Serie A side Fiorentina, who wanted to bring the player back to Italy.

Fiorentina and Genoa
In 2006, Fiorentina made a bid for the player, and Inter decided to sell the young talent, for €1.25 million. In his early stages with the Tuscan team, he found plenty of playing time, and even some first team action. During the 2007–08 Serie A season, Potenza found playing time very hard to find and was seldom used in the starting XI. In the summer of 2008, Fiorentina decided to sell the player to Genoa CFC.
In the first half of the 2008–09 Serie A season, Potenza also found playing time hard to come by with the Genoa based team.

Catania
During the 2009 winter transfer market, Potenza was seeking a transfer away from Liguria, and on 31 January 2009, it was confirmed that Potenza had joined Calcio Catania, in a co-ownership deal. He was brought in to strengthen the defensive line of the southern team who were pushing for UEFA Cup football. As a result of his arrival, Gennaro Sardo was sent out on loan from Catania to relegation battlers Chievo Verona. Potenza instantly earned his starting place under then-coach Walter Zenga, and began the new season as a starter under Gianluca Atzori, but after a mid-season injury, the right back failed to obtain regular first team action in the team under coach Siniša Mihajlović, who led Catania from 20th to 12th in the Serie A league table in his first five months in charge. In August 2011, Catania signed the full ownership of the right back, and he would go on to make 20 league appearances for the club that season.

During the 2011–12 Serie A season, under Vincenzo Montella, and the 2012–13 Serie A campaign, under Rolando Maran, the former Italy youth international has struggled for game time, appearing just 11 times in league competition over the course of those two seasons. Catania has broken the club's all-time points record total in the five consecutive seasons that Potenza has been with the team.

International career
Potenza earned nine caps with the Italy U19 national team, as well as two caps for the Italy U20. His international career took off with the Italy U21, where he made a total of 27 appearances, and scored one goal.

Coaching career
In August 2018, he was hired as head coach of Fidelis Andria in Serie D.

On 29 July 2019, he moved to Audace Cerignola, also in Serie D.

On 26 August 2020, he was hired by Serie C club Arezzo. On 19 October 2020, he was dismissed by Arezzo after the club only gained 1 point in the first five league games of the season.

Honours
Chennaiyin FC
 Indian Super League: 2015

Awards
2003 UEFA U-19 Championship
2004 UEFA U-21 Championship

References

External links
archivio.inter.it

1984 births
Living people
People from San Severo
Italian footballers
Inter Milan players
A.C. Ancona players
Parma Calcio 1913 players
A.C. ChievoVerona players
RCD Mallorca players
ACF Fiorentina players
Genoa C.F.C. players
Catania S.S.D. players
Modena F.C. players
Calcio Foggia 1920 players
Chennaiyin FC players
Casertana F.C. players
Serie A players
La Liga players
Serie B players
Serie C players
Indian Super League players
Italy youth international footballers
Italy under-21 international footballers
Italian expatriate footballers
Expatriate footballers in Spain
Expatriate footballers in India
Italian expatriate sportspeople in Spain
Italian expatriate sportspeople in India
Association football central defenders
Italian football managers
S.S. Fidelis Andria 1928 managers
S.S. Arezzo managers
Serie C managers
Footballers from Apulia
Sportspeople from the Province of Foggia